The 1892 Colgate football team represented Colgate University in the 1892 college football season. The team captain for the 1892 season was Preston Smith.

Schedule

References

Colgate
Colgate Raiders football seasons
College football undefeated seasons
Colgate football